Ibrahim Tounkara (born April 23, 1976) is a former Canadian football wide receiver who played seven seasons in the Canadian Football League (CFL) with the Calgary Stampeders, Hamilton Tiger-Cats and Saskatchewan Roughriders. He was drafted by the Stampeders with the fifth overall pick of the 2000 CFL Draft. He played CIS football at the University of Ottawa. Tounkara's brother Ousmane also played in the CFL.

Professional career

Calgary Stampeders
Tounkara was selected by the Calgary Stampeders with the fifth overall pick of the 2000 CFL Draft and played in 54 games, starting three, for the team from 2000 to 2002. He played in the Stampeders' 89th Grey Cup victory over the Winnipeg Blue Bombers on November 25, 2001. He was released by the Stampeders on June 14, 2003.

Hamilton Tiger-Cats
Tounkara signed with the Hamilton Tiger-Cats on July 23, 2003 and played in thirty games for the team from 2003 to 2004.

Saskatchewan Roughriders
Tounkara was signed by the Saskatchewan Roughriders on March 14, 2005 and played in 33 games for the team from 2005 to 2006.

References

External links
Just Sports Stats

Living people
1976 births
Players of Canadian football from Quebec
Canadian football wide receivers
Canadian football slotbacks
Ottawa Gee-Gees football players
Calgary Stampeders players
Hamilton Tiger-Cats players
Saskatchewan Roughriders players
Canadian football people from Montreal
University of Ottawa alumni